Aqua TV Show Show is the alternative title given to the tenth season of the animated television series Aqua Teen Hunger Force. The tenth season aired in the United States on Cartoon Network's late night programming block, Adult Swim. The season started on August 11, 2013 with "Muscles" and ended with "Spacecadeuce" on October 20, 2013, with a total of ten episodes. The show is about the surreal adventures and antics of three anthropomorphic fast food items: Master Shake, Frylock, and Meatwad, who live together as roommates and frequently interact with their human next-door neighbor, Carl Brutananadilewski. In May 2015, this season became available on Hulu Plus.

Episodes in this season were written and directed by Dave Willis and Matt Maiellaro. The theme music was composed by Flying Lotus. Almost every episode in this season featured a special guest appearance, which continues a practice used in past seasons. This season has been released in various forms of home media, including on demand streaming.

Production
Every episode in this season was written and directed by series creators Dave Willis and Matt Maiellaro, who have both written and directed every episode of the series. All episodes originally aired in the United States on Cartoon Network's late night programming block, Adult Swim. 

The opening theme entitled "Aqua Teen 24" and the closing theme entitled "Chasing Apples" were both composed by American alternative hip hop producer Flying Lotus, who has worked with Adult Swim several times over the years. Both songs were formally released on the Ideas+drafts+loops mixtape on December 10, 2013, including the instrumental for "Aqua Teen 24".

Cast

In season ten the main cast consisted of Dana Snyder who provided the voice of Master Shake, Carey Means who provided the voice of Frylock, and series co-creator Dave Willis who provided the voice of both Meatwad and Carl Brutananadilewski. "Spacecadeuce" features series creators Willis as Ignignokt and Matt Maiellaro as Err, and the return of Andy Merrill as Oglethorpe and Mike Schatz as Emory, after a multi-year absence from the series having been seen previously in Aqua Teen Hunger Force Colon Movie Film for Theaters. "Spacecadeuce" does not feature any other characters, with the exception of the debut Oglethorpe' father, which marks the second time in the series the Aqua Teens do not appear in an episode, the first being the season five episode "Sirens".

Season ten also features many guest appearances. John DiMaggio (credited as "Johnny Dee") provided the voice of Master Shake's muscles in "Muscles". Phillip Tallman provided the voice of the condo salesman in "The Dudies". In "Merlo Sauvignon Blanco" Henry Zebrowski provided the voice of Merlo and Lavell Crawford voiced Unbelievable Ron. In "Banana Planet" the Chimp Aliens were voiced by Matt Besser (credited as "Matt Bessar"), Lavell Crawford, Curtis Gwinn (credited as "Curjay Gwinn"). Jim Florentine voiced the unseen manager in "Working Stiffs", which also features Dana Swanson and Wendy Cross. "Skins" features Josh Warren, Thomas Decoud, Mary Kraft, T.M. Levin, and Rob Kutner. Casey Wilson (credited as "Rose Higdon") voiced Freda, the titular character in "Freda". In "Storage Zeebles" Bobcat Goldthwait voiced Zingo,  Mary Mack voiced Zaffy, Bobby Moynihan voiced Zarfonius, Paul Painter voiced the Wise and All-Knowing Bush, and Paul Rust voiced Zorf. Don was voiced by Brian Stack in "Piranha Germs", which also features Rob Poynter.

Episodes

Home release

The entire tenth season was released in HD and SD on December 8th, 2013 on iTunes, the Xbox Live Marketplace, and Amazon Video.

See also
 Alternative titles for Aqua Teen Hunger Force
 List of Aqua Teen Hunger Force episodes
 Aqua Teen Hunger Force

References

External links
 Aqua Teen Hunger Force at Adult Swim
 Aqua Teen Hunger Force season 10 at the Internet Movie Database

2013 American television seasons
Aqua Teen Hunger Force seasons